Aydoğmuş is a village in the Çay District, Afyonkarahisar Province, Turkey. Its population is 250 (2021).

References

Villages in Çay District